This is a list of notable current and former inmates at the United States Penitentiary, Terre Haute. Currently, 16 inmates have been executed, and a further 41 inmates are imprisoned on death row awaiting execution.

Death row

Executed

Former death row

Non-death row

See also
United States Penitentiary, Terre Haute
Capital punishment by the United States federal government
List of people executed by the United States federal government
List of U.S. federal prisons
Federal Bureau of Prisons
Incarceration in the United States

References

Prisoners and detainees by prison
List Terre Haute
Lists of prisoners and detainees